The 2002 UEFA European Under-17 Championship was the first edition of UEFA's UEFA European Under-17 Championship after changing the name of the competition. Denmark hosted the championship, during 27 April – 10 May. 16 teams entered the competition, and Switzerland defeated France in the final to win the competition for the first time.

Squads

Qualifying

Match Officials 
A total of 10 referees, 12 assistant referees and 3 fourth officials were appointed for the final tournament.

Referees
 Robert Krajnc	
 Emil Laursen	
 Jonas Eriksson
 Damien Ledentu
 Alan Kelly
 Augustus Viorel Constantin
 Roberto Rosetti
 Luc Wilmes
 Gerald Lehner
 Zsolt Szabo

Assistant referees
 Bill René Hansen
 Mark Simons
 Dimitrios Papadopoulos
 Anatolie Bodean
 Oscar David Martinez Samaniego
 Bo Abildgaard
 Danny Krasikov
 Koray Gencerler
 Palle Udsen
 Heigo Niilop
 Gunnar Gylfason
 Darren Drysdale

Fourth officials
 Johnny Rųn
 René Christensen
 Thomas Vejlgaard

Group stage

Group A

Group B

Group C

Group D

Knockout stage

Quarterfinals

Semifinals

Third place playoff

Final

References

External links
UEFA.com
RSSSF.com

 
UEFA
UEFA European Under-17 Championship
2002
U
April 2002 sports events in Europe
May 2002 sports events in Europe
2002 in youth association football